Julia thecaphora is a species of a sea snail with a shell comprising two separate hinged pieces or valves. It is a marine gastropod mollusk in the family Juliidae.

Distribution
The type locality for this species is probably Mazatlán, Mexico.

References

Juliidae
Gastropods described in 1857
Taxa named by Philip Pearsall Carpenter